Michael Evans (born 13 July 1992) is a former professional Australian rules footballer who played for the Melbourne Football Club in the Australian Football League (AFL).

He was drafted to Melbourne from the Claremont Football Club in the West Australian Football League with the 31st selection in the 2011 Rookie Draft.  He was then elevated to the senior list when Jake Spencer was placed on the long-term injury list.

In May 2011 he was named to make his debut with the Melbourne football club in the Round 9 match against St Kilda at Etihad Stadium. In a disappointing loss for the Demons, Evans had an impressive debut, gathering 27 disposals and seven inside 50s; named as one of Melbourne's best players and his good form was one of the few positives Melbourne could take away from the match.

Evans was delisted in November 2014, he and the club were in discussions in the weeks leading up to his delisting regarding re-drafting him as a rookie due to him still having a year left on his contract, however, he subsequently retired after deciding not to nominate for the draft.

Statistics

|- style="background-color: #EAEAEA"
! scope="row" style="text-align:center" | 2011
|style="text-align:center;"|
| 50 || 4 || 0 || 0 || 36 || 23 || 59 || 20 || 17 || 0.0 || 0.0 || 9.0 || 5.8 || 14.8 || 5.0 || 4.3
|-
! scope="row" style="text-align:center" | 2012
|style="text-align:center;"|
| 50 || 0 ||– || – || – || – | – ||– || – || – || – || – || – || – || – || – || –
|- style="background-color: #EAEAEA"
! scope="row" style="text-align:center" | 2013
|style="text-align:center;"|
| 32 || 9 || 6 || 4 || 89 || 51 || 140 || 42 || 22 || 0.7 || 0.4 || 9.9 || 5.7 || 15.6 || 4.7 || 2.4
|-
! scope="row" style="text-align:center" | 2014
|style="text-align:center;"|
| 32 || 3 || 1 || 1 || 19 || 6 || 25 || 5 || 8 || 0.3 || 0.3 || 6.3 || 2.0 || 8.3 || 1.7 || 2.7
|- class="sortbottom"
! colspan=3| Career
! 16
! 7
! 5
! 144
! 80
! 224
! 67
! 47
! 0.4
! 0.3
! 9.0
! 5.0
! 14.0
! 4.2
! 2.9
|}

References

External links

Living people
Casey Demons players
Claremont Football Club players
Melbourne Football Club players
Australian rules footballers from Western Australia
1992 births